This is a list of fossiliferous stratigraphic units in Nova Scotia, Canada.

See also

References 
 

Nova Scotia
Geology of Nova Scotia